Nizamabad (Rural) Assembly constituency is a constituency of Telangana Legislative Assembly, India. It is one among 2 constituencies in the city of Nizamabad with a population of 3,22,781. It is part of Nizamabad Lok Sabha constituency.

Bajireddy Goverdhan of Telangana Rashtra Samithi is currently representing the constituency for the second time.

Mandals

The Assembly Constituency presently comprises the following Mandals:

Members of Legislative Assembly Dichpalli

Members of Legislative Assembly Nizamabad (Rural)

Election results

Telangana Legislative Assembly election, 2018

Telangana Legislative Assembly election, 2014

See also
 Nizamabad (Urban) (Assembly constituency)
 List of constituencies of Telangana Legislative Assembly

References

Assembly constituencies of Telangana
Nizamabad district